Each winner of the 1979 Governor General's Awards for Literary Merit was selected by a panel of judges administered by the Canada Council for the Arts.  The 1979 awards were the first for which a shortlist of finalists was released a month before the presentation of the awards.

English

French

Governor General's Awards
Governor General's Awards
Governor General's Awards